Mary Moore is the former  mayor of Pearsall, Texas. Moore is the first elected female as well as the first African American to hold the position of Mayor of Pearsall.

Election
On May 9, 2015, Moore became the first African American woman to be elected Mayor of Pearsall, Texas, USA with 66% of the city's voters behind her. Her campaign was centered on bringing change to a corrupt city government that had been overwhelmed with lawsuits and grand jury indictments of its officials. She said that there was a "history of dysfunction at City Hall" and that she would run under the banner of "Honest Leadership".

Personal life
Moore was born November 17, 1957 in Bonita, Louisiana, the daughter of Thomas and Annie Lumpkin, and grew up on a cotton farm. Before becoming Mayor of Pearsall, Moore served her community for 15 years as a Physician assistant.

Education
Moore holds a Bachelor of Science in Physician Assistant Studies from the University of Texas Medical Branch at Galveston Texas.

References

External links

 City of Pearsall City of Pearsall Texas
 Frio-Nueces Current PEARSALL CITY COUNCIL

1957 births
Living people
Mayors of places in Texas
Women mayors of places in Texas
People from Morehouse Parish, Louisiana
People from Pearsall, Texas